Pachnoda marginata is a beetle from the subfamily Cetoniinae with a large number of subspecies that lives in west and central Africa. They are sometimes used as food for terrarium animals. The adult beetles are 20–30 mm, the larvae are very small when they hatch, but can grow as long as 60 mm. (2.36 in.) It is commonly called the sun beetle.

Description
The sun beetle comes in nine subspecies, the three common ones are: Pachnoda marginata aurantia, Pachnoda marginata marginata, Pachnoda marginata peregrina, with ranging colors. Pachnoda marginata aurantia comes from orange to a yellow-orange, some having a hue gradient towards the middle seen in diagram below. Pachnoda marginata marginata normally is red or crimson with little change between individuals. Pachnoda marginata peregrina, the more common amongst the subspecies, is a pale yellow or orange with brown spots; one spot being on the thorax and two spots on each elytra on each wing.

Sometimes the spots on the elytra are almost unnoticeable, as they seem to blend in with the rest of the body, this can be seen in the picture on the bottom left of Pachnoda marginata peregrina in the terrarium under "As pets".

The larvae of the pachnoda can sometimes make a low snore-like noise when making their cocoons.

List of the described subspecies

Life cycle
After mating, the female lays an egg in moist ground, which hatches after a short time into a larva that feeds voraciously for 2 to 5 months. When the larva has matured, it pupates for several weeks, and then transforms into an adult beetle. It will live as an adult for several months. Not all larvae survive pupation, many die before molting into pupa form.

As pets
Pachnoda marginata is an easy beetle to keep, requiring a terrarium with a lid (as it can fly out), a layer of moist ground, something to climb on, a warming lamp and food like bananas, apples and other fruits. The larva also eat leaves and other plant waste. It is important to not mix coniferous material in the substrate for these beetles as it may harm the larvae.

Gallery

References

  1. Rigout (J.), 1989, The Beetles of the World, volume 9, Sciences Nat, Venette. 
  2. Rigout (J.), 1992, The Beetles of the World, volume 12, Sciences Nat, Venette.

External links
Pachnoda marginata aurantia photos at Beetlespace.wz.cz
Pachnoda marginata marginata photos at Beetlespace.wz.cz
Pachnoda marginata peregrina photos at Beetlespace.wz.cz

Cetoniinae
Beetles of Africa